This is a list of libraries in Azerbaijan. 

 ANAS Central Library of Science
 National Library of Azerbaijan
 Library of Milli Majlis of the Republic of Azerbaijan
 Central Library named after Samad Vurgun of Barda region
 Republican Youth Library named after J. Jabbarly
 Republican Children's Library named after F. Kocharli
 Central City Library named after Mirza Alakbar Sabir
 Nakhchivan Autonomous Republic Library
 Library of the Institute of Literature named after Nizami
 Republican Scientific-Technical Library
 Republican Disabled by Eye Library

See also
List of museums in Azerbaijan

References

Libraries
Libraries
Azerbaijan